Ebenezer Kwadwo Teye Addo is a Ghanaian politician and the Central Regional Minister of Ghana. Prior to heading the Central Region, he was the Western Regional Minister.

References

Living people
National Democratic Congress (Ghana) politicians
Year of birth missing (living people)